Wrexham is a city in Wales.

Wrexham may also refer to these proximate things:

Administrative regions
 Wrexham (county borough), a principal area of Wales (from 1996)
 Wrexham (UK Parliament constituency), a Westminster electoral seat (from 1918)
 Wrexham (Senedd constituency), an electoral seat at Cardiff Bay (from 1999)
 Wrexham Built-up area, the city's largely contiguous urban area (determined in 2011)
 Wrexham Maelor, a defunct district of Clwyd (1974–1996)

Organisations
 Roman Catholic Diocese of Wrexham, a church body/district (founded 1987)
 Wrexham A.F.C., a professional association football club (founded 1864)
Wrexham AFC Women, (formerly Wrexham Ladies, founded 2003)
 Wrexham County Borough Council, a local government body (founded 1996)
 Wrexham Lager Brewery, a beer company (founded 1881) 
 Wrexham, Mold and Connah's Quay Railway, a rail company (1862–1897)

See also 
 
 
 Wrexham railway station (disambiguation)